Mina is a South Korean television series that aired on KBS2 in 2001.

Plot 
Park Mina, a highly popular singer who's won the hearts of many fans, gets into a car accident when her car swerves to avoid an oncoming vehicle. The car, which fell into a ditch, explodes and causes Mina to suffer second, third and fourth-degree burns on her body.

Mina's manager Kang Joon-seo happens to find Kim Soo-ryun, who looks almost exactly like Mina. Joon-seo initially asks Soo-ryun to take Mina's place for a short period of time until the real singer recovers. Soo-ryun agrees to the proposal because she badly needs money for her mother's surgical fees and her brother's tuition. After undergoing rigorous training from Joon-seo, Soo-ryun emerges as a near-perfect replica of Mina. However, Soo-ryun falls in love with Mina's boyfriend Jung Tae-hoon, and becomes enamored with fame and fortune.

Meanwhile, the real Mina returns, but the plastic surgeons were unable to restore her original appearance. Joon-seo, thinking that fans would not accept her new face, refuses to allow Mina to continue her singing career. Mina goes on television to reveal her true identity, and as Tae-hoon begins to investigate, Soo-ryun and Joon-seo feel threatened.

Mina later learns that Soo-ryun is her identical twin sister, and they had been abandoned at a Catholic orphanage after birth.

Soo-ryun asks Tae-hoon to forgive her, but he rejects her when he realizes that Joon-seo and Soo-ryun conspired to prevent the real Mina from coming back.

Depressed, Soo-ryun attempts to commit suicide. But Joon-seo stops her in time and tells her to prepare her final performance as Mina.

Cast 
 Chae Jung-an as Kim Soo-ryun/Park Mi-na
 Kim Sa-rang as Park Mi-na (after surgery)
 Kim Seung-soo as Jung Tae-hoon
 Ahn Jae-mo as Kang Joon-seo
 Shin Ae as Ha Yoon-soo
 Kim Min-ho as Park Hyuk
 Kang Yi-seul as Yeo Jin-hoo
 Han Jin-hee as Geum-bok
 Han Hye-sook as Choon-ja
 Yoon Ji-heon
 Choi Sang-hak as Soo-young
 Baek Il-seob
 Kim Min-jung
 Oh Ji-hye
 Lee Chang-hoon as Director Kang
 Cha Joo-ok
 Kim Mu-saeng
 Hong Choong-min

References

External links 
 Mina at KBS Drama Archive

Korean Broadcasting System television dramas
2001 South Korean television series debuts
2001 South Korean television series endings
South Korean romance television series